The Burgtor, built 1444 in late Gothic style, was the northern city gate of Hanseatic Lübeck, now in Germany. It is one of two towered gates remaining from the medieval fortifications, the other being the more famous Holstentor.

The Baroque helmet-like roof was added in 1685.

References

Buildings and structures in Lübeck
Gates in Germany
Tourist attractions in Schleswig-Holstein
Gothic architecture in Germany